In the context of amusement rides, air time, or airtime, refers to the time during which riders of a roller coaster or other ride experience either frictionless or negative G-forces. The negative g-forces that a rider experiences is what creates the sensation the rider feels of floating out of their seat. With roller coasters, air time is usually achieved when the train travels over a hill at speed. There are different sensations a rider will feel depending on the ride being an ejector or floater airtime ride.

In 2001 the Guinness World Records recorded Superman: Escape from Krypton, located at Six Flags Magic Mountain, Valencia, California, one of the fastest roller coaster in the world, where riders experienced a then record 6.5 seconds of 'airtime' or negative G-force. Hypercoasters, such as Magnum XL-200 at Cedar Point, Behemoth at Canada's Wonderland, Superman the Ride at Six Flags New England, Shambhala at PortAventura Park and Goliath at Six Flags Over Georgia, along with many wooden roller coasters, such as Balder at Liseberg, The Voyage at Holiday World in Santa Claus, Indiana, and El Toro at Six Flags Great Adventure in Jackson, New Jersey, are rides known for having a particularly high total air time. Upon opening in 2018 at Cedar Point in Sandusky, Ohio, Steel Vengeance, the world's tallest and fastest hybrid coaster, set the record for the most airtime on a roller coaster at 27.2 seconds.

Physics
Air time is a result of the effects of the inertia of the train and the riders: as the train goes over a hill transitioning from an ascent into a descent guided by the rails, the inertia of the relatively loosely-attached riders causes them to momentarily continue upwards, resulting in the riders being lifted out of their seats. The duration of air time on a particular hill is dependent on the velocity of the train, gravity, and the radius of the track's transition from ascent to descent. Zero-G (where the net vertical G-force is 0) is achieved when the downward acceleration of the train is equal to that due to gravity; where the downward acceleration is greater, negative Gs arise.

The zero-gravity roll is a roll specifically designed to create the effect of weightlessness and thereby produce air time.

Air time is generally understood to fall under two categories: "floater" air time and "ejector" air time. Floater air time provides passengers with the sensation of gently floating upwards, which can be described as near perfect weightlessness. Ejector is more violent and sudden, producing a sharp moment of negative g-forces lifting riders up off their seats. Roller coasters built by the manufacturing company Rocky Mountain Construction are famous for providing ejector air time.

As well as rollercoasters, drop towers can provide the feeling of weightlessness. For example, in the case of The Twilight Zone Tower of Terror at Disney's Hollywood Studios, Tokyo DisneySea, and Disneyland Paris, the elevator drops riders faster than gravity normally would, causing them to rise off of their seats by several inches whilst being held down by only a seat belt, creating the sensation of zero-G. Most drop towers, however, have shoulder bars, preventing riders from rising significantly from their seats, even where negative Gs are present.

The motion-simulator ride Mission: SPACE at EPCOT also includes the sensation of weightlessness after takeoff, just as one enters space.

References

Roller coaster elements
Weightlessness
Acceleration